"Grace" (originally known as "Government Name") is a song by American rappers Lil Baby and 42 Dugg. The track was released on February 28, 2020, as the fourth track off of Baby's album My Turn. Along with "We Paid", which is on the deluxe version of the album, it is one of two tracks on the album to include 42 Dugg. The track features back to back verses from the main performers layered on an ambient trap beat.

Music video 
The music video for the track was released on March 13, 2020, three days after 42 Dugg was arrested on federal gun charges. It has over 90 million views as of January 2021. The video was directed by Jon J.

Critical reception 
Josh Svetz of HipHopDX called the track "dull" and called 42 Dugg's feature "toothless". However, Danny Schwartz of Rolling Stone said the track's "fresh production ideas inject life into the album".

Commercial performance 
The track debuted at number 48 on the Billboard Hot 100, earning 42 Dugg his first charting single. The song has since gone 2× Platinum and has garnered over 110 million views on YouTube.

Charts

Weekly charts

Year-end charts

References 

2020 songs
42 Dugg songs
Lil Baby songs
Songs written by Lil Baby
Songs written by 42 Dugg